"The Monster" is a  science fiction short story by Canadian-American writer A. E. van Vogt, originally published in Astounding in August 1948. It was one of van Vogt's favorite stories. It was included in several anthologies, including 1952's Destination: Universe!, sometimes under the title "Resurrection".

It involves aliens who come across a long-dead Earth and explore it in an attempt to find out what killed the obviously intelligent life forms. Their exploration leads to their mortal danger when they discover a deadly monster.

Plot
In the distant future, Earth is visited by the Ganae, a race of warlike aliens who are surveying the planet as the site for a potential colony. Earth has suffered a mysterious catastrophe; its cities have decayed into ruins and the skeletons of dead humans litter the planet, but there are no signs of warfare or any other obvious disaster.

The Ganae possess "reconstructor" technology that can restore dead people to life with all of their memories intact. They attempt to interrogate revived humans for information about the destruction of Earth, but their efforts meet with limited success. The first man to be revived is an Egyptian pharaoh who believes the Ganae to be demons from the underworld; the second is an alcoholic who thinks the Ganae are merely part of a drunken hallucination; the third is comparatively modern and recognizes that the Ganae are aliens, but he is ignorant of the circumstances surrounding the end of the world. Each revived person is summarily executed once they are no longer useful to the Ganae. This proves difficult with the last human, who uses telekinetic powers to defend himself.

The expedition determines that Earth is suitable for Ganae colonization, but they learn nothing about the cause of humanity's extinction. Human civilization was highly advanced, both technologically and physically, but their entire race was nonetheless destroyed. Because the unknown force that eradicated mankind could conceivably threaten the Ganae's colonization efforts, the survey team reluctantly decides to revive another human for questioning in the hope of finding answers.

The fourth man to be revived is one found in the open. On awakening, he immediately teleports away for a period. He reappears and multiple attempts to kill him fail. When approached, he readily reveals the cause of Earth's destruction: a "nucleonic storm," dozens of light-years across, that extended beyond humanity's limited range for space travel and ravaged the planet. When the Ganae suggest they must colonize due to the great population pressure in their empire, he suggests that the Ganae should instead enact population control measures. The Ganae interpret his comments as a direct threat to their species' sovereignty and promise to return to Earth with a fleet of warships to overwhelm the monster's powers via sustained atomic bombardment.

While travelling back to their own territory, the Ganae discover that the monster has stowed away aboard their ship. They deduce that he intends to accompany them to the nearest Ganae-occupied world, steal the reconstructor technology, then teleport ahead to Earth and revive more people before the Ganae attack; it will be impossible for the Ganae to conquer the planet when confronted by multiple humans with god-like powers. Unable to contact any of their colonies for fear that the monster will trace their transmission beam and teleport to that location, the Ganae decide to fly their ship into a star, killing both the monster and themselves. They realize, too late, that his initial disappearance was aboard their ship and he has already learned about their technology. He returned aboard to manipulate the Ganae into committing a desperate act of suicide before they could warn their empire, ensuring that "no alien mind" will know about either the existence of planet Earth or the impending revival of the human race.

External links
Full text of "The Monster"

Science fiction short stories
Short stories by A. E. van Vogt
1948 short stories